"Journey to Where" is the fifth episode of the second series of Space: 1999 (and the twenty-ninth overall episode of the programme).  The screenplay was written by Donald James; the director was Tom Clegg.  The final shooting script is dated 18 February 1976, with amendments dated 2 March, 4 March, 11 March, 17 March, 18 March, 22 March and 25 March 1976.  Live-action filming took place Thursday 1 April 1976 through Wednesday 14 April 1976.

Story 
As the Moon drifts through empty space, a woman's voice is heard calling This is a neutrino transmission.  Calling Moonbase Alpha by neutrino transmission.  The mysterious signal is heard over every channel throughout the base.  John Koenig and the senior staff are amazed—this communication is specifically intended for them.  When the signal is acknowledged, the woman identifies her place of origin as Space Station One, Texas City, planet Earth.  As the community rejoices, Koenig is suspicious.  How can they be certain this signal is actually from Earth?

After this reality check, the senior executives review the facts.  A neutrino transmission is an advanced method of communication which can cover billions of miles in an instant.  A neutrino beam from Earth focused on the Moon could provide this miraculous two-way contact.  Theoretical experiments had just begun in 1999.  As their years in space would translate into the passage of decades on Earth, there would have been ample time for research and development.

Another voice—male, with an American Southern accent—introduces itself as Doctor Charles Logan, Texas City's senior space scientist.  He tells them the year on Earth is 2120.  This fantastic statement is followed by an even more astounding announcement—the technology now exists to teleport the Alphans back to Earth.  Time is of the essence as communications will be cut off by a galactic eclipse in seventy-two hours.  Making extensive astronomical calculations, Maya determines a massive star cluster is moving between the Moon and Earth's position; all contact will be blocked for nearly a century.

Logan calls to transmit the schematics for the transfer apparatus.  Still suspicious, Koenig quizzes him on Earth history to confirm his identity as a human being.  The scientist gives all the correct answers, down to the winner of the 1998 World Series.  Convinced, Koenig orders Technical Section to begin construction.  Optimism swells—with the exception of Maya.  She worries about being the lone alien on Earth and losing touch with those she has become close to...especially Tony Verdeschi.

An impromptu celebration breaks out when amateur brewmaster Verdeschi introduces the Command Centre staff to his latest concoction.  Unfortunately, he has more enthusiasm than skill, and the critics are not kind; after a single sip of his beer, an impish Maya transforms into Mister Hyde.  The party is interrupted by a call from Logan and his assistant, Carla Cross, to indoctrinate them to life in the 22nd century.  As Earth's environment was devastated by runaway pollution in the 21st century, humanity now resides exclusively in enormous, domed 'metro-complexes'.   With the outside atmosphere rendered unbreathable, 'nature' is now simulacra produced by a personal tele-sensual system.

Thirty hours prior to the eclipse, the transference dome is complete.  An instrument package is prepared for a trial run; its systems will simulate human vital signs during the teleport.  These will be read by a medical monitor (as worn on the wrist of every Alphan) re-tooled to transmit via neutrino carrier wave.  As the transfer is initiated, Logan receives a forecast of seismic activity in the Gulf of Mexico.  The test run continues and the instrument arrives on Earth intact and functioning perfectly.

Koenig is pensive.  The imprecise quake forecast renders the transfer process unstable—but with the impending eclipse, they cannot delay.  As three people can be conveyed at once, Koenig selects himself and volunteers Helena Russell and Alan Carter for the first trip.  They proceed to the dome and the countdown begins.  At minus two seconds, Texas City is struck by a major earthquake.  Too late to abort, Logan and staff watch a nimbus of light build in the reception area...then fade.  No one has materialised.  On Moonbase, the transference dome is also empty.

After the quake, Logan's people assess the damage while listening to Verdeschi's demands for immediate action.   Suddenly, Doctor Ben Vincent reports the medical monitors are still transmitting.  Wherever the three travellers ended up, they are alive.  At an unknown location, in a windswept forest glen, Koenig regains consciousness.  He finds Helena and Carter nearby.  Their relief at being alive soon changes to apprehension as they wonder where in the universe they could be—this wooded area is certainly not Earth's polluted wasteland.  Their only hope for rescue is for Logan to pinpoint their location.

When Helena catches a chill, the three trudge through the damp forest in search of shelter...as unseen figures spy on them from the bushes.  Soon, the doctor feels as if she is coming down with a cold.  She hides her concern:  after living in the germ-free atmosphere of Alpha, their resistance is low—a cold virus could prove fatal.  Later, Carter hears sounds of pursuit.  While searching the underbrush, the astronaut is attacked by a wild-haired, human-appearing man swinging an iron sword.  Hearing the scuffle, Koenig rushes to Carter's aid.  The two overpower the man, but he escapes into the woods.  Having left Helena alone, they return to find the now-feverish doctor surrounded by a half-dozen armed men.  The Alphans have no choice but to surrender.

On Moonbase, the staff is concerned over Helena's rising temperature.  With eighteen hours remaining before the eclipse, Logan plans to recreate the seismic event with explosives.  He hopes re-running the transfer procedure under the same circumstances will help locate the missing three.  As the second quake jolts Texas City, their damaged instruments pinpoint a location:  Earth.  Logan is dismissive; the lost Alphans would be dead if exposed to Earth's polluted environment.  His confidence dwindling, the scientist instructs Moonbase to make adjustments to the transference dome.  If Koenig and company should be located, engaging the teleport will return them to the Moon.

The castaways are taken to their captors' headquarters and thrust into a damp, dungeon-like cave.  Worse, Helena has a high fever and is wracked by coughing.  Her diagnosis is viral pneumonia, incurable under present circumstances.  As they look for any way out, Helena spies fungus growing on the cave walls.  She tells the men that common fungoids are the basis of the barmycin range of drugs, the only known cure for viral pneumonia.  If it possesses similar qualities, it could stave off the infection until they are rescued.  If untreated, she will die in a matter of hours.

Koenig and Carter manage to dispatch their guards and flee the cell with Helena and the fungus.  Hiding in the forest, they prepare the fungus as per the doctor's instructions.  By now, she is delirious, staring into the night sky and moaning about the Moon.  After feeding her a dose of the makeshift concoction, they follow her gaze and see a moon flitting in and out of view through the clouds.  Taking a long look, the men recognise familiar features and realise it is their Moon.  Astonished, they conclude they have been on Earth all along...but in a time before 1999.

With ten hours left, Maya is thinking along similar lines.  The odds are a billion to one they could have randomly landed on a habitable planet.  All Logan's recalculations have indicated their location as Earth.  The inescapable conclusion is that they are on Earth—but in a past or future time.  Logan reluctantly agrees to pursue this outlandish hypothesis.  On the past Earth, Helena's condition is much improved due to the fungoid mixture.  As she recovers, Koenig notices their wrist monitors flashing in a specific pattern—Alpha is trying to signal them via the medical telemetry channel.

Any chance to respond is lost when a band of soldiers crashes out of the surrounding bushes.  Koenig is frustrated at not being able to communicate—then floored when the leader speaks to him in Scots-accented English.  The Alphans soon discover their captor is the laird of Clan MacDonald.  He is the only clansman who speaks English, having learned it twenty-five years previous as chief castellan for the English prisoners taken at the Battle of Bannockburn.  MacDonald reckons they are English noblemen, one of whom is running away with the wife of a great lord.  The prisoners are escorted back to his headquarters, this time to a cavern furnished as a great hall, and join MacDonald for a banquet celebrating the impending new year.

During the meal, Helena, deprived of her impromptu remedy, begins to relapse.  As MacDonald gives a toast in Gaelic to honour the hero Robert Bruce and the Scottish victory at Bannockburn, Koenig and company huddle.  They cannot figure the date from MacDonald's clues, but providing Maya and Logan with the information will guarantee the calculation of space/time coordinates for the transfer beam.  Koenig begins tapping out a message on the control stud of his wrist monitor.  His actions attract the attention of the chieftain, who tears the unfamiliar device off his wrist.

As MacDonald reaches for Helena's monitor, she slumps, eyes glazed from sickness.  Jumping to conclusions, the alarmed laird backs away and shouts in Gaelic that the English fugitives carry the Black Death.  The clansmen herd Koenig and company away at swordpoint.  The Alphans are taken to a torture chamber and manacled to the rock wall.  Koenig tries to reason with the laird that Helena's illness is not the Plague and can be cured.  Knowing only one cure for the pestilence, McDonald heaves his torch into the bales of straw and faggots piled at their feet.  As flames rise, Koenig stretches out for Helena's wrist and desperately begins to tap her monitor's control stud in rapid succession.

With thirty minutes until the eclipse, both the Alphans and Earth scientists have accepted defeat.  Suddenly, the readout for Helena's monitor goes berserk, flashing on and off in a series of long and short pulses—which an older astronaut realises is Morse code.  Computer provides translation:  Scotland...New Year...Bannockburn plus twenty-five.  Logan's computer calculates the target date as 25 March 1339 and the transfer is initiated.  The clansmen recoil as the three Alphans vanish from the pyre in an unearthly radiance.

Safe on Alpha, Koenig bids Logan and associates an appreciative farewell.  As the eclipse commences and contact is broken, the Commander goes to check on the recovering Helena.  The doctor reflects that, with Earth's rich history, what bad luck it was to have landed in 14th-century Scotland.  Koenig kiddingly reminds her of even worse historical events they could have blundered into.  She musters a sad smile; with that kind of history, who wants to go back to Earth?

Cast

Starring 
 Martin Landau – Commander John Koenig
 Barbara Bain – Doctor Helena Russell

Also starring 
 Catherine Schell – Maya

Featuring 
 Tony Anholt – Tony Verdeschi
 Nick Tate – Captain Alan Carter

Guest stars 
 Freddie Jones – Doctor Charles Logan
 Isla Blair – Carla Cross

Also featuring 
 Jeffery Kissoon – Doctor Ben Vincent
 Yasuko Nagazumi – Yasko
 Roger Bizley – MacDonald
 Laurence Harrington – Tom Jackson
 Norwich Duff – First Texas Operative
 Peggy Page – Old Crone

Uncredited artists 
 Sarah Bullen – Kate
 Robert Davies – Maya/Mister Hyde
 John Wood – Second Texas Operative
 Terry Walsh – Highlander Guard
 Robert Reeves – Peter
 Jenny Cresswell – Command Centre Operative

Music 

The score was re-edited from previous Space: 1999 incidental music tracks composed for the second series by Derek Wadsworth and draws primarily from the scores of "The Metamorph" and especially "The Exiles".

Production notes 

 The final shooting script contained the characters of Sandra Benes (with her being known by the 'Sahn' diminutive for the first time) and Bob Mathias; however both Zienia Merton and Anton Phillips had left the production by that time (due to lessened involvement and lower salaries in the second series).  They were replaced by Japanese actress Yasuko Nagazumi, playing the new character Yasko, and Jeffery Kissoon, assuming the new role of Doctor Ben Vincent.  Nagazumi was, at that time, the wife of veteran Space: 1999 director Ray Austin and had been featured in the previous Anderson live-action production, The Protectors. Other major changes would involve the relocation of MacDonald's clan.  The original script had them living in a village, with the laird headquartered in a great house and the Alphans attempted immolation occurring in a wooden hut. Budget restrictions would see them moved into the cavern sets constructed for "The Metamorph".
 This episode would feature the first of several outdoor shoots for the second series.  Both Martin Landau and Barbara Bain objected to leaving the confines of Pinewood Studios, so a studio paddock on the back lot became the Scottish Highlands. MacDonald and his clansmen would dress in costumes originally created for Roman Polanski's 1971 feature film version of Macbeth. Attentive viewers would note that Isla Blair, the actress portraying Carla, had appeared in the first-series episode "War Games" under heavy make-up as the female alien.  The Alphans' test instrument was revamped from an Ariel satellite seen in "The Last Sunset".
 Actor Freddie Jones was casting director Lesley de Pettitt's first choice for the role of Charles Logan.  Others considered were Ronnie Barker, Colin Blakely, T. P. McKenna, Clive Revill and Patrick Troughton.  Other contenders for clan laird MacDonald were Peter Jeffrey and Nigel Davenport.  The old crone (played by Peggy Page) who would manacle Koenig and company to the dungeon wall was added by director Tom Clegg.  He gave her the backstory of having contracted and recovered from the Plague, thus making her the only clan member to not fear touching the presumably infected prisoners.
 The actual date for New Year's Day 1339 was 25 March as the Gregorian calendar (which defines the first day of each year as 1 January) was not observed in Scotland until 1600 (and 1752 in England).

Novelisation 

The episode was adapted in the sixth Year Two Space: 1999 novel The Edge of the Infinite by Michael Butterworth published in 1977.  This novel was not released in the United Kingdom and only as a limited edition in the United States and Germany.

The original German-published novel Der Stahlplanet (The Steel Planet) would provide a sequel to this story as, after a course change, the Moon moves beyond the eclipsing star cluster and contact is re-established with Earth. The Alphans are ultimately transported home, concluding the Space: 1999 narrative.

References

External links 
Space: 1999 - "Journey to Where" - The Catacombs episode guide
Space: 1999 - "Journey to Where" - Moonbase Alpha's Space: 1999 page

1976 British television episodes
Space: 1999 episodes